André Dias Lopes Gomes (born 27 July 1998) is a Portuguese handball player for MT Melsungen and the Portuguese national team.

He represented Portugal at the 2020 European Men's Handball Championship and the 2021 World Men's Handball Championship.

References

External links

1998 births
Living people
Portuguese male handball players
Sportspeople from Braga
FC Porto handball players
Competitors at the 2018 Mediterranean Games
Mediterranean Games competitors for Portugal
Handball players at the 2020 Summer Olympics